İsmail Zehir (born 29 June 2003) is a Turkish professional footballer who plays as a midfielder for TFF Second League club Batman Petrolspor on loan from Alanyaspor.

Club career
Zehir is a youth product of the academies of Kartalspor and Galatasaray. He transferred to Alanyaspor on a 5-year contract on 15 August 2021 as part of a deal that sent Berkan Kutlu the other way. He made his professional and Süper Lig debut with Alanyaspor as a late substitute in a 1–0 win over Fatih Karagümrük on 22 May 2022.

On 14 January 2023, Zehir joined Batman Petrolspor on loan.

Internatinoal career
Zehir is a youth international for Turkey, having most recently played for the Turkey U19s.

References

External links
 
 

2003 births
Living people
People from Pendik
Footballers from Istanbul
Turkish footballers
Turkey youth international footballers
Association football midfielders
Alanyaspor footballers
Batman Petrolspor footballers
Süper Lig players
TFF Second League players